Ty Girlz were girl dolls manufactured by Ty Inc. Similar to the Ty Beanie Babies, the Ty Girlz are on a limited release pattern with dolls being introduced and older ones retired at various times.  Ty Girlz are plush toys that are connected to an online virtual world at TyGirlz.com.  Introduced to the global market on April 13, 2007, Ty Girlz was one of only a few virtual worlds geared to girls. The line was discontinued in 2013 and the virtual world shut down on June 7 of that same year.

Advertising
When the Ty Girlz were debuted at toy fairs, Ty had posters and cut-outs of the Girlz to promote them. Ty even had a billboard in Atlanta, Georgia, showing Sizzlin' Sue saying "Who's that Girl?". That phrase soon became a popular tag for the line. In September 2007, the Ty Girlz got a MySpace and YouTube page. 

In the Spring 2008 Ty retailer catalog, retailers were able to purchase clothing made exclusively for Ty Girlz.

Sweet Sasha and Marvelous Malia controversy
In January 2009, Ty released two new Ty Girlz, one named Sweet Sasha and the other named Marvelous Malia. Media reports linked the names to Sasha and Malia Obama, daughters of President Barack Obama. On January 21, a Ty spokesperson told the Chicago Sun-Times that the Obama daughters were indeed the inspiration for the dolls. In response to Ty, Michelle Obama's press secretary said that Ty did not ask permission to use the Obama daughters' first names, saying "It is inappropriate to use young private citizens for marketing purposes." On January 22, when asked whether the new Ty Girlz were inspired by Sasha and Malia Obama, Ty's Senior Vice President of Sales said that the dolls were not made to physically resemble either of the Obama daughters and that the names chosen "worked very well with the dolls". Ty said that the process of naming dolls is proprietary information and would not say how the names were given to the dolls. In February 2009, Ty decided to retire the original dolls and give them new names, Marvelous Mariah and Sweet Sydney. The CEO of Ty said the name change was due to Michelle Obama's disapproval of the original names. Ty stated that, while the original names were inspired by "this historic time in our nation's history", they were not named after the Obama daughters. Ty promised to donate the profits from sales of the original dolls to a charity, the Andre Agassi Charitable Foundation for youth education.

Following the recall, dolls that had already been shipped to the marketplace sold on eBay for $3,000.

List of dolls

Notes 

 Punky Penny Blog presented by Ty Girlz

Stuffed toys